Jean Middleton (30 August 1928 – 14 December 2010) was an anti-apartheid activist in South Africa. She was born in Durban and trained as a teacher. She was married to Harold Strachan. Middleton moved to Johannesburg and became active in the Congress of Democrats and then the South African Communist Party. She helped Nelson Mandela by letting him use her flat. She was imprisoned, held in solitary confinement and then restricted from working or associating with others. Middleton moved to the United Kingdom and taught English in London. In 1991 she returned to South Africa where she edited Umsebenzi. In 1998 her book, Convictions: a woman political prisoner remembers was published. Late in life she suffered from emphysema and returned to Britain.

References

1928 births
2010 deaths
South African activists
South African women activists